The open accuracy landing event at the 2001 World Games in Akita was played from 17 to 19 August. 14 parachuters, from 7 nations, participated in the tournament. The competition took place at Ogata Athletic Field in Ōgata .

Competition format
A total of nine rounds were contested. After sixth round six athletes were eliminated. In round seven athletes had to jump three times. The best four parachuters qualifies to the final rounds. Athlete with the lowest score is a winner.

Results

References

External links
 Results on IWGA website

Open accuracy landing